Katwa Lok Sabha constituency was one of the 543 parliamentary constituencies in India. The constituency centred on Katwa in West Bengal, which was abolished following the delimitation of the parliamentary constituencies in 2008.

Overview
As per order o the Delimitation Commission issued in respect of the delimitation of constituencies in the West Bengal, this parliamentary constituency ceased to exist and constituent assembly segments are now part of either of the two new constituencies: Bardhaman Purba Lok Sabha constituency or Bardhaman-Durgapur Lok Sabha constituency.

Assembly segments
Katwa Lok Sabha constituency was composed of the following assembly segments:
 Balagarh (SC) (assembly constituency no. 188)
 Pandua (assembly constituency no. 189)
 Kalna (assembly constituency no. 276)
 Nadanghat (assembly constituency no. 277)
 Manteswar (assembly constituency no. 278)
 Purbasthali (assembly constituency no. 279)
 Katwa (assembly constituency no. 280)

Members of Parliament

For Members of Parliament from this area in subsequent years see Bardhaman Purba Lok Sabha constituency and Bardhaman-Durgapur Lok Sabha constituency.

Election results

2006 Bye-election
A bye-election was held on 16 September 2006 following the death of the sitting MP, Mahboob Zahedi on 8 April 2006.

Congress Did not Contest In 2006 Bye Polls In Katwa Lok Sabha Constituency.They Supported Trinamool Congress Candidate.***

General election 2004

General elections 1951-2004
Most of the contests were multi-cornered. However, only winners and runners-up are mentioned below:

See also
Bardhaman district
List of former constituencies of the Lok Sabha

References

Former Lok Sabha constituencies of West Bengal
Former constituencies of the Lok Sabha
2008 disestablishments in India
Constituencies disestablished in 2008